KIOE (91.3 FM) is a non-commercial educational radio station licensed to serve the community of Utulei, a village on the island of Tutuila in American Samoa, since May 2011. The station's broadcast license is held by Leone Church of Christ.

KIOE broadcasts a religious radio format.

History
In October 2007, Leone Church of Christ applied to the Federal Communications Commission (FCC) for a construction permit for a new broadcast radio station. The FCC granted this permit on May 20, 2008, with a scheduled expiration date of May 20, 2011. The new station was assigned call sign "KIOE" on May 18, 2011. After construction and testing were completed in May 2011, the station was granted its broadcast license on May 24, 2011.

References

External links

Tutuila
IOE
Radio stations established in 2011
2011 establishments in American Samoa